Three Thousand is a 2017 Canadian documentary film directed by Asinnajaq. Mixing animation with archival footage, the film explores the cinematic representation of Inuit. The 14 minute documentary dives into the past, present, and future of Inuit "in a new light".

The film received a Canadian Screen Award nomination for Best Short Documentary Film at the 6th Canadian Screen Awards.

References

External links
 
 Three Thousand at the National Film Board of Canada

2017 films
2017 short documentary films
Canadian short documentary films
Documentary films about Inuit in Canada
Canadian animated short films
National Film Board of Canada animated short films
2010s English-language films
2010s Canadian films